Parravicini is an Italian surname. Notable people with the surname include:

Benjamín Solari Parravicini (1898–1974), Argentine artist
Florencio Parravicini (1876–1941), Argentine actor
Francesco Parravicini (born 1982), Italian retired footballer
Giacomo Parravicini or Paravicini, also referred to as il Gianolo (1660–1729), Italian painter

Italian-language surnames